Jinshan North railway station is a railway station in Fengjing, Jinshan District, Shanghai, China. It is on the Shanghai–Hangzhou high-speed railway, also known as the Huhang Passenger Railway. The station opened on 26 October 2010.

References

Railway stations in Shanghai
Railway stations in China opened in 2010